Borušov is a municipality and village in Svitavy District in the Pardubice Region of the Czech Republic. It has about 200 inhabitants.

Administrative parts
The hamlet of Svojanov is an administrative part of Borušov.

References

Villages in Svitavy District